The killer in the backseat (also known as High Beams) is an urban legend from the United States and United Kingdom. It was first noted by folklorist Carlos Drake in 1968 in texts collected by Indiana University students.

Legend
The legend involves a woman who is driving and being followed by a car or truck. The mysterious pursuer flashes his high beams, tailgates her, and sometimes even rams her vehicle. When she finally makes it home, she realizes that the driver was trying to warn her that there was a man (a murderer, or escaped mental patient) hiding in her back seat. Each time the man sat up to attack her, the driver behind had used his high beams to scare the killer, causing him to duck back down.

In some versions, the woman stops for gas, and the attendant asks her to come inside to sort out a problem with her credit card. Inside the station, he asks if she knows there's a man in her back seat. (An example of this rendition can be seen in the 1998 episode of Millennium, "The Pest House".) In another, she sees a doll on the road in the moors, stops, and then the man gets in the back.

In another version, the woman gets into her car and then a crazed person leaps out from nowhere and starts shouting gibberish and slamming their hands on the car. The woman quickly manages to escape from them but no matter how far or which direction she drives, every time she stops, the same crazy person appears and attacks the car. The woman then arrives at a police station and tells the police about the crazed person. The police calm her down and offer to drive her back to her house (or a safe place in other versions). But when they go with her to get her things from the car, they find the killer hiding behind the driver's seat. As it turns out, the crazed person that was chasing the woman was the ghost of one of the killer's victims, trying to either warn the woman or get at the killer.

Origin
The story has been identified as circulating at least as early as the late 1960s, and may have gained more widespread recognition after appearing in a letter to advice columnist Ann Landers in 1982. It has been speculated, including by Snopes founder David Mikkelson, that the legend may have been inspired by a vaguely similar case which took place in 1964, in which an escaped murderer hid in the backseat of a car, only to end up shot by the car's owner, a police detective. Other somewhat similar, though not identical, cases have since been noted, including by folklorist Jan Harold Brunvand.

Interpretations

The story is often told with a moral. The attendant is often a lumberjack, a trucker, or a scary-looking man: someone the driver mistrusts without reason. She assumes it is the attendant who wants to do her harm, when in reality it is he who saves her life.

In popular culture 
 The Twilight Zone episode "Perchance to Dream" is notable for its protagonist's allusions to 'that woman who was killed by a psychopath hiding in the back seat of her car', in an episode first broadcast around eight or nine years before the story is believed to have entered into urban legend. It is unknown if this is pure coincidence or deliberately referencing some otherwise unrecorded 'proto-myth', or even perhaps helped to inspire the legend.
 John Carpenter's 1978 film Halloween has the character Annie Brackett killed when she enters the car and the killer Michael Myers sneaks up from behind the back seat and slashes her throat.
 A version of the story by author Alvin Schwartz appears in the 1981 collection of short horror stories for children Scary Stories to Tell in the Dark.
 Terror in Topanga, the first segment of the 1983 anthology film Nightmares, is a depiction of this legend. 
 The story is featured in a 1992 an episode of The Simpsons when Otto tells Lisa the legend as a bedtime story. In his version, the victim is chased by another car that keeps ramming her vehicle, and she drives off the road into the woods and loses the other car. She is then killed by an axe-wielding maniac who had been hiding in her backseat. He then reveals himself to be said maniac.
 The 1998 film Urban Legend begins with this scenario.
 In a 1998 episode of Millennium, "The Pest House", Frank Black chases a doctor from a mental hospital after one of its patients escapes into the back of her car and tries to kill her. When she pulls over at a gas station, the attendant saves her by taking her inside.
 The story is featured in a 1998 episode of the television show Beyond Belief: Fact or Fiction under the title "Bright Lights".
 A 2003 episode of the detective series Jonathan Creek, "The Coonskin Cap", begins with a version of this legend, except that instead of a killer inside the car, the pursuing driver is trying to alert the woman that there is a body tied to the back of her car.
 The 2003 Tamil film from India, Whistle, begins with this scenario.
In the 2009 film Zombieland, Columbus (Jesse Eisenberg) explains to Tallahassee (Woody Harrelson) that Rule #10 of surviving a zombie apocalypse is to check the backseat for hidden dangers, such as re-animated zombies. Later on in the film, after getting robbed at gunpoint again, Tallahassee admits to Columbus that Wichita (Emma Stone) and Little Rock (Abigail Breslin) got the drop on him and Tallahassee because he (Tallahassee) didn't check the backseat.
In the 2013 film Curse of Chucky, Nica Pierce is sent to a psychiatric hospital, suspected of a set of killings committed by Chucky. As the arresting officer gets into his car, Tiffany Valentine, who had been hiding in the back seat, slits his throat with a nail file.
 In the 2015 episode of Scream Queens, "Ghost Stories", Chanel #5 (played by Abigail Breslin) is driving and a truck starts honking at her and using his high beams. When she pulls over at a petrol station, he tells her about the Red-Devil (the murderer), lurking in her back seat but then he is stabbed by it while #5 makes her escape.
 The 2022 episode of American Horror Stories, "Drive", Marci (played by Bella Thorne) is driving home from a night club and a jeep starts flashing its high beams at her. Marci loses the jeep and hides behind a car wash. Her friend Piper tells Marci of the legend. Later, it's revealed the driver of the jeep really did see someone in the backseat, but it wasn't a killer, it was actually someone Marci kidnapped herself, subverting the legend.

See also
Balete Drive White Lady

References

Entry at Snopes
Info at About.com
 Brunvand, Jan Harold. Encyclopedia of Urban Legends. 2001. 
 Brunvand, Jan Harold. The Choking Doberman. 1984.

Urban legends